Drochia is a village in Drochia District, in the north of Moldova. At the 2004 census, it had a population of 2,843.

At the 1930 census, the locality had a population of 2,269. It was part of Plasa Climăuți of Soroca County.

References

Villages of Drochia District